Fevzi Zemzem (27 June 1941 – 21 March 2022) was a Turkish professional footballer who played as a striker for Göztepe and the Turkey national team.

Playing career
Zemzem played for Göztepe for his entire fourteen-year professional career. He scored 136 goals Turkish league goals during that time and was the top scorer in the 1967–68 season. He was also the joint top-scorer in the 1968–69 season with 17 goals but asked that Metin Oktay receive the trophy instead.

In the second leg of the Turkish Cup final on 20 May 1970, Zemzem scored twice to help Göztepe to a 3–1 win on the night and a 4–3 win on aggregate against Eskişehirspor. On 28 June 1970, he scored in the Turkish Super Cup as Göztepe defeated Fenerbahçe 3–1 to secure the title.

At the international level, Zemzem played 18 times for the Turkey senior national team.

Managerial career
His first accomplishment came when he was the coach of Orduspor. That year Orduspor finished fourth in the league and qualified for the UEFA Cup. Samsunspor (1981–82) and Diyarbakırspor (in 1985–86 season) were promoted to premier league thanks to Zemzem's coaching. Tanju Çolak and Dobi Hasan were his students.

Honours
Göztepe
Turkish Cup: 1968–69, 1969–70; runner-up: 1966–67
Turkish Super Cup: 1970; runner-up: 1969

Individual
Gol Kralı: 1967–68
Turkish Cup top scorer: 1969–70

See also
 List of Süper Lig top scorers
 Metin Oktay

References

External links

Fevzi Zemzem manager stats in Turkey at mackolik.com

1941 births
2022 deaths
Sportspeople from Hatay
Turkish footballers
Association football forwards
Turkey international footballers
Turkey youth international footballers
Süper Lig players
Göztepe S.K. footballers
Turkish football managers
Göztepe S.K. managers
Orduspor managers